Steven Curtis Chapman (born November 21, 1962) is an American contemporary Christian music singer, songwriter, record producer, actor, author, and social activist.

Chapman began his career in the late 1980s as a songwriter and performer of contemporary Christian music and has since been recognized as the most awarded artist in Christian music, releasing over 25 albums. He has also won five Grammy awards and 59 Gospel Music Association Dove Awards, more than any other artist in history. His seven "Artist of the Year" Dove Awards are also an industry record. As of 2014, Chapman has sold more than 10 million albums and has 10 RIAA-certified Gold or Platinum albums.

History 
Steven Curtis Chapman was born to Judy and Herb Chapman in Paducah, Kentucky, on November 21, 1962. Chapman's father is a guitar teacher in Paducah, and young Steven and older brother Herb Jr. grew up playing the guitar and singing.

Upon finishing high school, Chapman enrolled as a pre-med student at Georgetown College in Kentucky. After several semesters he transferred to Anderson College in Indiana, but soon dropped out and went to Nashville to pursue a career in music. While in Nashville he briefly attended Belmont University. He began working a music show at Opryland USA while dedicating time to songwriting.

In the 1980s, Chapman wrote a song called "Built to Last", which was recorded by prominent gospel group the Imperials. The strength of the song prompted him to be signed to a songwriting deal with Sparrow Records, where he rose to prominence. As of 2007, artists like Sandi Patty, Billy Dean, Glen Campbell, the Cathedral Quartet and Roger Whittaker have recorded Chapman's songs.

In 1987, Chapman released his first album, First Hand. The album included the song "Weak Days", which peaked at No. 2 on the Contemporary Christian Music chart. In 1988, he followed with his second album, Real Life Conversations, which earned him four more hits, including the No. 1 song "His Eyes". The song, which was co-written by James Isaac Elliott, earned the Contemporary Recorded Song of the Year award from the Gospel Music Association in 1989. That year, he also won a GMA Award for Songwriter of the Year.

After that, Chapman followed with more albums like More to This Life and For the Sake of the Call. All of these albums featured several No. 1 singles and were awarded several GMA Awards. The latter also gave Chapman his first Grammy in the Best Pop Gospel Album category. These achievements strengthened his position in the Christian music scene.

In 1992, Chapman made a successful shift into a more mainstream audience with his album The Great Adventure. The album garnered Chapman two more Grammys, for the album and for the title track video, again in gospel categories. After Sparrow Records was purchased by EMI/Liberty, they began to market the album to a broader audience, pushing it to gold status in 1993. The success of the album prompted Chapman to record one of his concerts and release it as The Live Adventure, both as a video and a CD. This continuation won Chapman more GMA Awards, and also a new award from American Songwriter magazine for Songwriter and Artist of the Year.

Chapman continued to enjoy success with albums Heaven in the Real World, Signs of Life, and Speechless. In 2000, he provided the voice of Baloo in The Jungle Book Groove Party and reprised the role 22 years later in Chip 'n Dale: Rescue Rangers. In 2001, with the release of Declaration, Chapman got more attention in the Billboard 200. That album, along with 2003's All About Love, peaked in the Top 15. The follow-up, All Things New, peaked at No. 22.

Chapman has also released four Christmas albums, beginning with 1995's The Music of Christmas. In 2003 he released Christmas Is All in the Heart exclusively through Hallmark Gold Crown Stores and in 2005, he released All I Really Want for Christmas and finally Joy was released in 2012.

In 2006, Chapman went on tour to several Asian countries. His website claims his concert for U.S. troops serving in South Korea was the first Christian concert ever performed for the troops in that country, and a concert in Shanghai, China, was "the first public performance by a Gospel recording artist event in the city open to China passport holders", and the third-largest concert in Shanghai that spring. The tour also took the artist to Australia, New Zealand, the Philippines, Hong Kong, and Singapore. During the same period, his song "The Blessing" reached No. 1 on Thailand radio charts.

In 2007, Chapman co-headlined Newsong's annual Winter Jam tour with Jeremy Camp. For the tour, he brought his sons' band, Colony House, on tour to play as his backing band, along with longtime keyboardist Scott Sheriff. Chapman also released This Moment, which included the hit singles "Cinderella" and "Yours", in October 2007. "Cinderella" was chosen for WOW Hits 2009. On April 20, 2008, Chapman was awarded a star on Nashville's Walk of Fame for his contributions in Christian music. On November 3, 2009, Chapman released his seventeenth album Beauty Will Rise. Many of the songs from this album are inspired by the death of his daughter, Maria Sue. He claims that the songs on the album are his "personal psalms". Chapman, his wife and two sons each got a tattoo of the flower that Maria drew before her untimely death.

In August 2012, Chapman announced his departure from Sparrow Records and his signature to Sony Music's Provident Label Group. He released his fourth Christmas album, JOY, on October 16, 2012. Deep Roots was released exclusively through Cracker Barrel Old Country Store, Inc. on March 11, 2013. In September 2013, Reunion Records released Chapman's eighteenth album (the second with Reunion Records), The Glorious Unfolding, which is also his first studio album in seven years that features completely original material. The album received critical acclaim, with many critics ranking it among his other chart-topping albums. The album peaked at No. 27 on the US Billboard 200.

Beginning in September 2014 until September 2017, Chapman hosted the "Sam's Place: Music for the Spirit" concert series at the Ryman Auditorium in Nashville and featured performances by the likes of MercyMe, Amy Grant, Michael W. Smith and Third Day. In 2015, Chapman released "Warrior" as the official song for the soundtrack to War Room. "Amen", was sent to Christian AC radio on October 6, 2015. In 2019, Chapman released the sequel to his Billboard Bluegrass #1 Album Deep Roots entitled Deeper Roots: Where the Bluegrass Grows, which also peaked #1 on the Billboard Bluegrass charts.

Personal life
Chapman is a devout Christian and is married to Mary Beth Chapman (née Chapman). The couple met in the early 1980s at Anderson University in Anderson, Indiana, and married in the fall of 1984.

The couple currently live in Franklin, Tennessee, and have three biological children, Emily Elizabeth, Caleb Stevenson, and Will Franklin. They also have three daughters that they adopted from China. Shaohannah Hope Yan, Stevey Joy Ru and Maria Sue Chunxi. (Maria died in 2008 as the result of a tragic accident.) 

Together, Chapman and his wife have written three children's books with adoption themes: Shaoey And Dot: Bug Meets Bundle (2004), Shaoey and Dot: The Christmas Miracle (2005), and Shaoey and Dot: A Thunder and Lightning Bug Story with illustrations by Jim Chapman (2006). Chapman's modern fairytale, Cinderella: The Love of a Daddy and His Princess (2008) chronicles and celebrates the blessings of childhood, family, love, and life. Together with minister Scotty Smith, Chapman has authored two books for the adult inspirational market: Speechless (1999), and Restoring Broken Things (2005). Chapman's song "All About Love" has been featured in commercials for the Fox television show Celebrity Duets. In 2016, he released the memoir Between Heaven and the Real World: My Story.

Chapman and his sons recorded a cover of the song "I Love My Lips" under the name of "Stevenson" after his oldest son Caleb Stevenson for the 2003 Veggie Rocks album. His sons Caleb and Will perform together as the band Colony House. Chapman is best friends with Geoff Moore.

On November 10, 2011, Chapman and his wife became grandparents for the first time when a baby girl, Eiley Eliza Richards, was born to Emily and her husband Tanner Richards, in Ireland.

Chapman's brother-in-law, Jim Chapman, was the bass vocalist in the 1990s country music group 4 Runner. Steven's son, Will Chapman, married singer/songwriter Jillian Edwards in December 2012.

Death of Maria Sue Chunxi Chapman
Maria Sue Chunxi Chapman died from her injuries and blood loss in a driveway accident on May 21, 2008. The accident happened eight days after Maria's 5th birthday. Will Franklin was pulling into the driveway of their house after he auditioned for a musical at school and Maria Sue was running to meet him so she could ask Will to put her on the monkey bars. They didn't see each other in time and Will accidentally ran over Maria. Maria was  life flighted via air medical services to Vanderbilt Children's Hospital. The paramedics tried to save Maria on the way to the hospital, but she was pronounced dead on arrival. At the time of Maria's death, the Chapman family was preparing to celebrate Caleb's high school graduation from Christ Presbyterian Academy and Emily's engagement just hours before the accident.

During the memorial service for Maria, the family expressed their faith in God and their love for one another.

After Maria's accident, the Chapman family spoke publicly about their loss and the role that faith played in their healing. They have appeared on Good Morning America, Larry King Live, in People, The 700 Club, and Huckabee. Maria was buried in the flower girl dress that she was planning to wear to Emily's October wedding. The family put Maria's ballet shoes, her favorite doll, letters from her brothers and sisters, and other personal mementos to Maria in her coffin. During the funeral service, Will kept Maria's security blanket around his shoulders. Maria Sue is buried in Williamson Memorial Gardens in Franklin, Tennessee. Chapman's subsequent album, Beauty Will Rise, focuses on Maria's death and its aftermath. Chapman almost quit his singing career due to Maria's death and he nearly chose to never sing "Cinderella" again, but soon realized that Maria would have wanted him to continue singing and to honor her memory by singing "Cinderella". An investigation of Maria's death was performed by the Tennessee Highway Patrol. It was ruled as a tragic accident and no charges were filed. In November 2009, a year after Maria died, Chapman performed at a special concert at Harvest Christian Fellowship. Greg Laurie, the pastor of Harvest, suffered the loss of his own son, Christopher Laurie, just months after Chapman's loss. Chapman performed several songs from Beauty Will Rise.

Since Maria's unexpected death, Mary Beth Chapman has written and released a book about the death of her daughter called Choosing to SEE: A Journey of Struggle and Hope. Steven and Mary Beth eventually honored Maria's memory by opening Maria's Big House of Hope.

Honorary doctorate
On May 7, 2011, Chapman received an Honorary Doctorate of Music from Anderson University and was the commencement speaker for the class of 2011.

Activism and charity work
In the late 1990s, Chapman became involved in youth violence prevention efforts following the 1997 Heath High School shooting at his alma mater in West Paducah, Kentucky. Chapman even dedicated a song, "With Hope", from his 1999 album, Speechless, to the families who lost someone in the shooting. In addition, he was asked to sing at the joint funeral held for the three victims. Chapman later gave a memorial concert and joined Charles Colson and others in creating a video designed to sensitize teenagers to the signs of serious violence planning among peers and to encourage them to report plans that are told to them.

In 2009, Show Hope finished building Maria's Big House of Hope, a medical care center in China that provides holistic care to orphans with special needs. Maria's Big House of Hope is also dedicated to the memory of the late Maria Sue Chunxi Chapman. Also in 2009, Chapman and his wife received the Children's Champion Award from the charitable organization Children's Hunger Fund for their work with Show Hope.

In September 2011, Chapman and his wife were awarded the Congressional Angels in Adoption award by the Congressional Coalition on Adoption Institute (CCAI) in Washington, D.C.

Chapman also has promoted the international charity World Vision for at least a decade, serving as spokesman for Project Restore, its program serving the U.S. Gulf Coast region in recovery from Hurricane Katrina, in cooperation with the Gospel Music Association. He has also occasionally traveled to Uganda to help with the problem of street children, and to help orphans and adoption organizations. He has played at local churches, including KPC (Kampala Pentecostal Church) in Kampala.

In 2020, Chapman was a featured guest at Keith & Kristyn Getty's Sing! Global 2020 Conference designed to train music leaders and instill the importance of solid doctrine and Gospel saturated lyrics in Christian music.

Politics 
During the 2016 presidential election, Chapman encouraged evangelical Christians to trust that "God is on the throne" and "resist the urge to argue and fight with each other about our opinions." Following the 2021 United States Capitol attack on January 6, Chapman released "A Desperate Benediction" as a live, home-studio video to his Facebook page. In the prose that accompanied the posting he wrote, "now more than ever before, it seems like the soul of our world (& our nation) is aching, longing and desperate for peace."

Discography

Chapman has released 23 studio albums, more than 25 albums total in his career, including 4 Christmas, 2 live, and several compilation albums. He has sold more than 11 million total albums (including two certified Platinum albums, eight certified Gold albums) and has had 49 No. 1 radio songs.

First Hand (1987)
Real Life Conversations (1988)
More to This Life (1989)
For the Sake of the Call (1990)
The Great Adventure (1992)
The Live Adventure (1993)
Heaven in the Real World (1994)
The Music of Christmas (1995)
Signs of Life (1996)
Speechless (1999)
Declaration (2001)
All About Love (2003)
All Things New (2004)
All I Really Want for Christmas (2005)
This Moment (2007)
Beauty Will Rise (2009)
re:creation (2011)
JOY (2012)
Deep Roots (2013)
The Glorious Unfolding (2013)
Worship and Believe (2016)
Deeper Roots: Where the Bluegrass Grows (2019)
Still (2022)

Awards

References

External links

 

Steven Curtis Chapman at Everything for Adoption
Show Hope
Mary Beth Chapman
Tragic Accident Tests Faith
Maria Sue Chunxi Chapman at Find A Grave

1962 births
Living people
20th-century American singers
20th-century Christians
21st-century American singers
21st-century Christians
American male film actors
American male guitarists
American male singer-songwriters
American singer-songwriters
American male voice actors
American performers of Christian music
Anderson University (Indiana) alumni
Georgetown College (Kentucky) alumni
Grammy Award winners
Guitarists from Kentucky
Heath High School (Kentucky) alumni
Musicians from Paducah, Kentucky
Performers of contemporary Christian music
Songwriters from Kentucky
Sparrow Records artists
20th-century American guitarists
20th-century American male singers
21st-century American male singers